Revenue Technology Solutions began as a division Control Data Corporation. It developed a yield management system for Republic Airlines on a mainframe in 1982. Revenue Technology Services Corporation was spun off as an independent company through a purchase by YMS, Inc. in 1991.

Revenue Technology Services provides global revenue management and profit optimization software and consulting services.  The verticals supported are airlines, cargo, coach, cruise/ferry lines, and railroads. Delivered products include revenue management for passenger and cargo, pricing management and business intelligence / analytics.

External links
 

Business intelligence companies
Control Data Corporation
Information technology consulting firms of the United States
Types of marketing
Revenue
Republic Airways
Supply chain software companies